Mijajlo Marsenić (born 9 March 1993) is a Serbian handball player for Füchse Berlin and the Serbian national team.

Club career
After playing for his hometown club Berane, Marsenić joined Partizan in September 2010. He spent four years at the club and won two consecutive championships. Between 2015 and 2018, Marsenić played for Macedonian club Vardar and helped them win the 2016–17 EHF Champions League.

International career
A Serbia international since 2012, Marsenić participated in two World Championships (2013 and 2019) and three European Championships (2016, 2018 and 2020).

Honours
Partizan
 Handball League of Serbia: 2010–11, 2011–12
Vardar
 Macedonian Handball Super League: 2015–16, 2016–17, 2017–18
 Macedonian Handball Cup: 2015–16, 2016–17, 2017–18
 EHF Champions League: 2016–17
 SEHA League: 2016–17, 2017–18

References

External links

1993 births
Living people
People from Berane
Serbs of Montenegro
Serbian male handball players
RK Partizan players
RK Vardar players
Füchse Berlin Reinickendorf HBC players
Handball-Bundesliga players
Expatriate handball players
Serbian expatriate sportspeople in North Macedonia
Serbian expatriate sportspeople in Germany